Acinetobacter chengduensis is a Gram-negative, obligate aerobic and non-motile bacterium from the genus of Acinetobacter which has been isolated from hospital sewage from China.

References

Moraxellaceae
Bacteria described in 2020